Statistics of Austrian first league in the 1935–36 season.

Overview
This was the 25th season of 1.Liga, contested by 12 teams: the top 11 from last season, and the winner of the 2.Liga play-off (Favoritner AC).

League standings

Wiener AC were replaced by Post SV, the winner of the 2.Liga play-off.

Results

References
Austria - List of final tables (RSSSF)

Austrian Football Bundesliga seasons
Austria
1